John Golland (14 September 1942 in Ashton-under-Lyne – 14 April 1993 in Dukinfield) was an English composer.

He is most famous for his works for brass band, such as Sounds, Atmospheres, Peace, Rêves d'Enfant, his two euphonium concerti and a flugelhorn concerto. He also composed incidental music for the BBC sitcom Dear Ladies.

External links
 Biography

1942 births
Brass band composers
20th-century classical musicians
20th-century British composers
1993 deaths